Dear Mr. Capote is a 1983 novel by Gordon Lish. His first novel, it takes the form of a letter to Truman Capote from a serial killer, "Yours Truly", who wishes Capote to write his biography and share the proceeds.

References
 Missives from a murderer, George Stade, New York Times, June 12, 1983.

1983 American novels